Chittenango is a village located in Madison County, New York,  United States. The village is in the southern part of the Town of Sullivan. The population was 4,896 at the 2020 census. Chittenango is the birthplace of L. Frank Baum, author of The Wonderful Wizard of Oz.

History 
The name of the village is derived from the Oneida name for Chittenango Creek, Chu-de-nääng′, meaning "where waters run north." While the name "Chittenango" is often thought by locals to mean "river flowing north" or "where the waters divide and run north," a reference to the direction of water flow from the creek's point of origin to Oneida Lake, there is no derivation for these alternatives. On an 1825 map of the area, the village is called Chittening, a name used by early settlers which is thought to be derived directly from Chu-de-nääng′. According to American anthropologist Lewis H. Morgan who studied Iroquois customs and language in his 1851 book League of the Iroquois, the name "Chittenango" may have come from Chu-de-nääng′ Ga-hun′-da, a redundant combination of the Oneida terms for "Chittenango Creek" (Chu-de-nääng′) and "creek" (Ga-hun′-da).

Initial growth of this village is largely attributed to the construction of the Erie Canal which officially opened in 1825, joining Buffalo on Lake Erie with Albany, the capital of New York, and the Hudson River. The Erie Canal passes just north of the village. The Chittenango Canal Company, incorporated in 1818, constructed a canal  in length connecting Chittenango to the Erie Canal. The village became a virtual canal town upon the construction of the Chittenango Canal Boat Landing, which featured a three-bay dry dock where canal boats were built and repaired. The canal brought prosperity, growth and expansion to the village. It created a need for inns, hotels and restaurants, and area farms and factories found the canal useful as an inexpensive and easy way to ship goods further along the canal or beyond. Because the canal connected to the Hudson River, boats were able to ship goods south to the metropolis of Manhattan.

Development increased considerably due to John B. Yates, who opened and operated grist and saw mills, a woolen mill, stores, and founded the village's first church in 1828, the Dutch Reformed Church, now the First Presbyterian Church of Chittenango.

The village was incorporated on March 15, 1842. At the time, it contained between 900 and 1,000 inhabitants, about 180 dwellings, three churches, the Yates Polytechnic Institute, a large woolen factory, two large water lime factories, one flouring mill, three taverns and ten stores. In 1853, the first bank in the village, the Chittenango Bank, was organized and began business with capital of $110,000, which increased to $150,000 one year later. The bank closed business nearly one decade later, and in December 1863 the First National Bank of Chittenango was organized, occupying the same building erected by the first bank. This bank also closed down in 1883.

Soon after the incorporation of the village, the first fire company and engine house was built in 1843.

The first newspaper in the village was the Chittenango Herald, established in 1831 by Isaac Lyon. It later bore successively the name of Chittenango Republican, the Chittenango Phoenix, and the Democratic Gazette, until it was discontinued in 1853. In 1869 the Madison County Times was established and papers were published until 1975, at which time the Chittenango-Bridgeport Times was formed. This paper ran until 2009 when it merged with other greater Syracuse area papers to form the current Eagle Newspapers.

The Chittenango Pottery Company, largely owing its early success to its location near the Chittenango Landing, was established in 1897. After burning down twice, the present, now abandoned brick structure was erected.  After years of neglect and disrepair, the building was demolished in 2015.

The Chittenango Pottery and St. Paul's Church are listed on the National Register of Historic Places.

Geography
Chittenango is located at  (43.045901, -75.873785).

Climate 

The climate can range from hot and often humid summers to very cold winters.

Demographics

As of the census of 2010, there were 5,081 people, 1,993 households, and 1,380 families residing in the village. The population density was 2117.1 people per square mile (817.4/km). There were 2,085 housing units at an average density of 868.8 per square mile (336.3/km). The racial makeup of the village was 96.2% White, 1.1% African American, 0.7% Native American, 0.5% Asian, 0.1% from other races, and 1.6% from two or more races. Hispanic or Latino of any race were 1.8% of the population.

There were 1,993 households, out of which 47.5% had children under the age of 18 living with them, 52.1% of households had married couples living together, 13.3% of households had a female householder with no husband present, and 30.8% were non-family households (people living in households with no members related to the householder). 24.2% of all households were made up of individuals, and 9.7% had someone living alone who was 65 years of age or older. The average household size was 2.51 and the average family size was 2.97.

In the village, the population was spread out, with 25.0% under the age of 18 years, 7.1% from 18 to 24 years, 11.6% from 25 to 34 years, 14.4% from 35 to 44 years, 16.7% from 45 to 54 years, 12.1% from 55 to 64 years, and 13.0% who were 65 years of age or older. The median age was 39.8 years. For every 100 females, there were 89.0 males. For every 100 females age 18 and over, there were 86.2 males.

Detailed socioeconomic information collected during past censuses was not collected during the 2010 Census. The 2010 Census used only a short form asking ten basic questions, including name, sex, age, date of birth, ethnicity, race, and homeownership status. According to the 2000 Census, the median income for a household in the village was $43,750, and the median income for a family was $50,179. Males had a median income of $34,787 versus $25,902 for females. The per capita income for the village was $20,014. About 4.1% of families and 6.2% of the population were below the poverty line, including 7.1% of those under age 18 and 8.8% of those age 65 or over.

Education
The Chittenango School District enrolls about 2,350 K-12 students in two elementary schools (K-4), one middle school (5-8) and one high school (9-12). The district is one of 23 members of the Onondaga-Cortland-Madison BOCES, and employs about 210 instructional staff and 160 additional support staff.

Transportation

This is a small, private grass strip, and home to several small propeller aircraft including a beautiful biplane.

Chittenango is served by exit 34A and a travel plaza (rest area) on Interstate 90.

Culture
Chittenango holds a three-day annual festival called Oz-Stravaganza!, formerly called OzFest, to celebrate the literary works of author L. Frank Baum, who was born in Chittenango on May 15, 1856. The children's novel The Wonderful Wizard of Oz was published on May 17, 1900. The weekend-long festival, usually held during the first Friday/Saturday of June and the weekend thereof, includes amusement rides, and a parade, which features many community groups. The parade has also featured actors and actresses who played Munchkins in the 1939 film The Wizard of Oz, including Jerry Maren, Karl Slover, Meinhardt Raabe, and Margaret Williams Pellegrini.

Oz-Stravaganza! was cancelled during 2020 and 2021 due to health concerns over Covid-19. As Covid restrictions were gradually lifted, the festival came back in 2022, though on a smaller scale, with a lower amount of vendors than previous festival years.

The Wizard of Oz theme continues beyond the annual festival. The village is the home of the International L. Frank Baum & All Things Oz Historical Foundation. The group is a 501(c)3 non-profit, and is 100% volunteer run. It is Chartered by the NY State Board of Regents. The organization coordinates the annual Oz-Stravaganza festival and also the All Things Oz Museum located in the historic village downtown. The museum features a collection of original costumes and props from the OZ universe, as well as collectibles and Baum family heirlooms. The foundation collection is nearly 15,000 items, and 1,200 - 1,400 are on exhibit at any time.

In 1982, the village installed a brick sidewalk on either side of the downtown portion of Genesee St. which was painted yellow as an homage to the yellow brick road from the novels and film. The sidewalk required regular upkeep as the color would fade over time and the bricks would chip and crack due to the freeze-thaw cycles in the colder months and regular use throughout the year. As part of a downtown Chittenango revitalization project in 2007, the sidewalks were replaced with concrete which was then stamped and colored to replicate the yellow brick road. The old bricks have been made available to purchase at the All Things Oz museum and during the festival to raise money for the town's festival. In 2017, the village also added a yellow brick road sidewalk to Dr. West memorial park where the annual Oz-stravaganza festival is held.

Chittenango, and its yellow brick road featured in episode 6 of Michael Portillo's "Great American Railroad Journeys" shown on the BBC. 
Chittenango also features a new Wizard of Oz themed casino that officially opened on June 2, 2015, called the Yellow Brick Road Casino, operated by the Oneida Indian tribe that also operates the much larger Turning Stone Casino and Resort located near Verona, New York.

Notable people
 John Kirby Allen (1810–1838), co-founder of Houston, Texas; Texas state legislator, and backer of the Texas Revolution.  John Allen was partner in at that store in Chittenango in 1826 for at least a year.
 L. Frank Baum, author of The Wonderful Wizard of Oz. The village holds an annual festival called Oz-Stravaganza! honoring Baum's life and literary works.
 Jerry Lawson, professional distance runner, former American record holder (1993) in the marathon with a time of 2:09:35. He was a graduate of Chittenango High School.
 Dave Mirra, professional BMX bike athlete. 
Lewis Selye, former US Congressman

Gallery

See also 
 Chittenango Falls State Park
 Chittenango Landing Dry Dock Complex
 Chittenango ovate amber snail
 Old Erie Canal State Historic Park

References

External links
 Village of Chittenango, New York
 Chittenango Landing Canal Boat Museum
 CLCBM The Erie Canal, Chittenango, NY
 Chittenango Central Schools

Villages in New York (state)
Syracuse metropolitan area
Populated places established in 1842
Villages in Madison County, New York